Loco-Motion, known as  in Japan, is an arcade puzzle game developed by Konami in 1982 and released by Sega in Japan. The North American rights were licensed to Centuri. In Loco-Motion, the player builds a path for their unstoppable locomotive by moving tracks which will allow it to pick up passengers.

The game was ported to Intellivision, the Tomy Tutor, and–under a different name–MSX. A clone programmed by Carol Shaw of Activision, Happy Trails, was published for Intellivision before the official version was released.

Gameplay

Loco-Motion is an updated version of a sliding block puzzle game in which the player can move tiles horizontally or vertically within a rectangular frame that contains one empty square. The tiles are sections of railroad track and the player must use them to construct a path for a locomotive that never stops moving. Laid out around the edges of the frame are several stations with passengers that must be picked up.

The player uses a joystick to slide a piece of the track into the vacant square and can use a button to accelerate the locomotive. However, it is always in motion and cannot be stopped. The player must avoid running into a dead-end barricade, a barrier at the playfield edge or the edge of the empty square; doing so costs one life. As the player moves the pieces of track around, the route the locomotive will take is highlighted in yellow up to any dead end.

A countdown timer occasionally appears on a station. If passengers are waiting there and the player picks them up before the countdown reaches zero, the remaining amount is added to the score as bonus points. If not, the passengers send a "Crazy Train" onto the tracks and the player must avoid crashing into it. If a countdown timer at an unoccupied station reaches zero, the station is destroyed and becomes a pair of barrier squares. Crazy Trains can be crashed into each other to destroy them but doing so creates a new pair of dead ends or destroys a station if the collision happens within it.

On higher levels, there are special pieces of track that have one entrance and three different exits. The player cannot choose which exit the locomotive takes from these as it is picked randomly. Bonus points are awarded each time the locomotive crosses one of these pieces of track.

A level is cleared when there are no more passengers to pick up, and the player then moves onto the next level which is a different layout, bigger or smaller with more dead ends. Also, the bonus stations appear more frequently and, on later levels, one or more Crazy Trains will be on screen at the outset.

If the player creates a closed loop of track and rides on it for several seconds, a "Loop Sweeper" appears which moves around the loop behind it. If the Sweeper reaches the locomotive, the player loses a life. Sweepers can be crashed into each other or into Crazy Trains to destroy them with the same consequences as above.

An extra life is awarded at 10,000 points.

Scoring

Bonus station points are randomly determined, with a beginning high of 2,470 points.

Ports 
Loco-Motion was ported to Intellivision (published by Mattel) and the Tomy Tutor. Activision's Happy Trails, with strikingly similar gameplay, was released prior to the Intellivision port of Loco-Motion. Positive reviews of Happy Trails resulted in Mattel releasing Loco-Motion at a reduced price.

An MSX port from Konami itself was published as Crazy Train.

An M Network version for the Atari 2600 was canceled on July 5, 1983 for unknown reasons.

Legacy
Game Boy and Game Boy Color ports were released in Japan and the UK as part of the four volume Konami GB Collection. In Japan the game was released for Game Boy with Super Game Boy features, yet in the UK it was colorized and translated into English for the Game Boy Color.

Confuzion (1985) for the ZX Spectrum and Commodore 64 is similar in design to Loco-Motion.

Junction (1990) for the Sega Genesis is similar in concept with isometric graphics. A Game Gear version was also published, retaining the original arcade game's top-down view. They were published by Micronet under license from Konami.

Notes

References

External links

 Technical information on Loco-Motion
 Loco-Motion entry at the Centuri.net Arcade Database

1982 video games
Arcade video games
Konami games
Konami arcade games
Intellivision games
MSX games
Puzzle video games
Sega arcade games
Top-down video games
Video games developed in Japan